John Sheehan (1885–1972) was a Liverpool City Councillor and Alderman who served as Lord Mayor of Liverpool.

Biography

Sheehan was the successful labour candidate for South Scotland ward and was elected to Liverpool City Council in 1929. He represented South Scotland Ward from November 1929 until 1953 when the ward was absorbed under new boundary revisions.  He was subsequently elected to represent Vauxhall ward. He was elected as an Alderman in October 1953.

He served as Lord Mayor of Liverpool from 1956 to 1957. As Lord Mayor he led a Liverpool civic delegation on a tour of the Russian Black Sea Port of Odessa.

See also

 1929 Liverpool City Council election
 1953 Liverpool City Council election
 Liverpool City Council elections 1880–present
 Liverpool City Council
 Mayors and Lord Mayors of Liverpool 1207 to present

References

Mayors of Liverpool
1885 births
1972 deaths